New Mexican Disaster Squad was an American hardcore punk band.  It was formed in Orlando, Florida in 1999.  Their last show was at the Fest 7 on November 1, 2008, though the band did reunite to play Radfest in North Carolina, May 2010.

The band's MySpace page describes their sound as "harken[ing] back to the glory days of American hardcore with equal influences from the east and west coasts".

They released four full-length albums, the last, Don't Believe (2006), on Jade Tree Records.

On December 28, 2008, a posting on the band's MySpace page announced that Goldfarb, Minino, and Johnson had joined with Tony Foresta, the vocalist from Municipal Waste, to form a band called No Friends.

Eight years later, Goldfarb, along with Chris Pfister, Chris Kretzer, and Zach Anderson formed a new Orlando punk-pop band, Debt Neglector. In August 2018, they released their first album on SmartPunk Records, Atomicland.

Members
Brian Wayne Etherington – Guitar, hat
Sam Johnson – Vocals, guitar
Richard Minino – Drums
Alex Goldfarb – Bass guitar, vocals
Matt Whitman - Bass guitar

Discography
"Weapons and Equipment of Counter Terrorism" 7" (1999)
New Mexican Disaster Squad/Destination: Daybreak Split CD (2000) (Breaker Breaker Records)
Abrasive Repulsive Disorder CD (2002) (Breaker Breaker Records)
New Mexican Disaster Squad CD (2003) (A-F Records)
New Mexican Disaster Squad / Western Addiction Split LP/CD (2004) (No Idea Records)
Don't Believe CD (2006) (Jade Tree Records)
Don't Believe LP (2006) (No Idea Records)
Peace With Nothing EP Digital Download (2007) (Jade Tree Records)
Peace With Nothing EP 7" USA (2007) (Kiss Of Death Records)
Peace With Nothing EP 7" Europe (2007) (Rat Patrol Records)

Other appearances
"You're Incorrect" Take Action! Vol 4 (2004)

References

External links
NMDS MySpace page
http://www.bandtoband.com/band/new-mexican-disaster-squad

Hardcore punk groups from Florida
Musical groups from Orlando, Florida
Jade Tree (record label) artists
A-F Records artists